Lisbet Stuer-Lauridsen (born 22 September 1968) is a Danish former professional badminton player who competed at the 1992 and 1996 Summer Olympics.

Sports career

1984 -1997: Professional 
Lisbet Stuer-Lauridsen was a Singles and Doubles player, it was very difficult for her to choose one discipline, but to come to the quarterfinals in both disciplines was not enough for her and she had a lot of injuries from 1984 - 1990 because of playing two disciplines, so the last 6 years she only focused on double. This decision showed to be right, it didn't take long before she was top 1 - 4 on the world ranking and she finished her career as number 1 on the world ranking.

1978-1984: Junior success and WTA debut
Lisbet’s Stuer-Lauridsen won EM under 18 years when she was under 16 years in Double and Single. She won the nationals in her ages group in singles and double. The first unofficial world Championships was played under 18 years and Lisbet attended as 16 years and runner-up in singles, winner in Ladies double and runner-up in Mixed Double.

Playing style
Lisbet Stuer-Lauridsen was a player with a strong mental and technical strength and was as well good at placing her smash so it made it difficult for the opponent to return it and made it offend easier for her double partner to be able to come in at the net.

Major achievements
 1984 - 1985 DM wins singles
 1884 - 1985 the world No 10 Singles  
 1990 - 1991 Dutch Open Winner  
 1992 - 1997 DM wins doubles  
 1993 - 1994 Danish Open winning doubles  
 1992 - 1997 the world no. 1 to 4 double  
 1994 - 1995 Swiss Open winner 
 1993 - 1994 World Championships bronze double  
 1996 - 1997 Swiss Open Winner 
 1996 - 1997 Hong Kong Open Winner 
 1996 - 1997 Malaysia Open Winner  
 1995 - 1996 Indonesia Open winner  
 1995 - 1996 Danish Open winning doubles  
 1996 - 1997 EM Championship win doubles

References

Danish female badminton players
Olympic badminton players of Denmark
Badminton players at the 1992 Summer Olympics
Badminton players at the 1996 Summer Olympics
1968 births
Living people